Mikhail Ivanovich Kononov (25 April 1940 – 16 July 2007) was a Soviet and Russian actor. People's Artist of Russia (1999).

Biography
He first appeared on stage at school. In 1963, Mikhail Kononov graduated from the Shchepkin Drama School and was admitted to the Maly Theatre. However, after five years of acting in theatre, in 1968 he quit the stage forever. He married Natalya Pavlovna Kononova in 1969.

The typical image of his hero, a simple-hearted, kind and unaffected fellow, started taking its shape in his debut film Nash Obshchiy Drug (Our Common Friend) (1961) and further on in the revolutionary tragic comedy Nachalnik Chukotki (Chief of Chukotka) (1966), the war drama V ogne broda net (No Path Through Fire) (1967), the heroic comedy Na voyne, kak na voyne (At War as at War) (1968), among others.

As the actor stated himself, his best role was that of Foma in Andrei Tarkovsky's well-known historic drama Andrei Rublev. One of the most popular films starring Mikhail Kononov was the series Bolshaya Peremena (Big School-Break) (1972), where he played the young teacher Nestor Petrovich. He was also popular for his roles in children's films. Many Russian viewers remember Kononov as the sly and crafty space pirate Krys in the legendary children's sci-fi miniseries Gostya iz budushchego (Guest from the Future) (1985). Kononov considered himself a tragicomic actor.

In the last years of his life Mikhail Kononov rejected most of the roles offered to him due to his dislike of modern Russian cinema.

Two weeks before his death, he went to hospital with pneumonia. However, in the hospital, his condition only worsened as he did not have enough money to afford medicine. Mikhail Kononov died from tromboembolism on 16 July 2007 in Moscow. His body was cremated and buried in the Vagankovo cemetery.

Awards 

 Honored Artist of the RSFSR (1989)
 People's Artist of Russia (1999)

Selected filmography
Come Tomorrow, Please..., 1963 as passenger of bus
Goodbye, Boys, 1964 as Vitya Anikin
 Andrei Rublev, 1966 as Foma
Chief of Chukotka, 1966 as Bychkov
 No Path Through Fire, 1968 as Semyonov
At War as at War, 1969 as Alexander Maleshkin
 The Beginning, 1970 as Pavlik
Big School-Break, 1972 as Nestor Petrovich Severov
 Finist, the brave Falcon, 1975 as Yashka
Captain Nemo, 1975 as Conseil
Twenty Days Without War, 1976 as Pasha Rubtsov
Story of an Unknown Actor, 1977 as Petya Strizhov
 Siberiade, 1979 as Rodion Klimentov
 Vasili and Vasilisa, 1981 as Vasili
Station for Two, 1982 as Nikolasha, a policeman
 Crazy Day of Engineer Barkasov, 1983
 Alone and Unarmed, 1984 as Pyotr, porter
Guest from the Future, 1985 as Krys, space pirate / spaceport employee Mikhail Ivanovich
 She with a Broom, He in a Black Hat, 1987 as wizard
The Inner Circle, 1991 as Kliment Voroshilov
 Assia and the Hen with the Golden Eggs, 1994 as Father Nicodemus
 The First Circle, 2006 as Spiridon

References

External links

Biography

1940 births
2007 deaths
Burials at Vagankovo Cemetery
Male actors from Moscow
20th-century Russian male actors
Soviet male actors
Russian male film actors
Russian male stage actors
Honored Artists of the RSFSR
People's Artists of Russia
Deaths from embolism
Deaths from pneumonia in Russia